New eugenics, also known as liberal eugenics (a term coined by bioethicist Nicholas Agar), advocates enhancing human characteristics and capacities through the use of reproductive technology and human genetic engineering. Those who advocate new eugenics generally think selecting or altering embryos should be left to the preferences of parents, rather than forbidden (or left to the preferences of the state). "New" eugenics purports to distinguish itself from the forms of eugenics practiced and advocated in the 20th century, which fell into disrepute after World War II.

History 

New eugenics is distinguished from previous versions of eugenics by its emphasis on informed parental choice rather than coercive governmental control.

Eugenics is sometimes broken into the categories of positive eugenics (encouraging reproduction among the designated "fit") and negative eugenics (discouraging reproduction among those designated "unfit"). Another distinction is between coercive eugenics and non-coercive eugenics. According to Edwin Black, many positive eugenic programs were advocated and pursued during the early 20th century, but the negative programs were responsible for the compulsory sterilization of hundreds of thousands of persons in many countries, and were contained in much of the rhetoric of Nazi eugenic policies of racial hygiene and genocide. New eugenics belongs to the positive eugenics category. Bioethicists generally consider coercive eugenics more difficult to justify than non-coercive eugenics, though coercive laws forbidding cousin marriage, for example, are widely considered justified. Compulsory sterilization of those deemed unfit is a form of coercive eugenics that has been overwhelmingly rejected in the 21st century, and is illegal under many national and international laws.

New eugenics practices 
New eugenics generally supports genetic modification or genetic selection of individuals for traits that are supposed to improve human welfare. The underlying idea is to improve the genetic basis of future generations and reduce incidence of genetic diseases and other undesirable traits. Some of the practices included in new eugenics are: pre-implantation diagnosis and embryo selection, selective breeding, and human enhancement through the use of genetic technologies, such as embryo engineering or gene therapy.

Ethics 

New eugenics was founded under the liberal ethical values of pluralism, which advocates for the respect of personal autonomy, and egalitarianism, which represents the idea of equality for all people. Arguments used in favor of new eugenics include that it is in the best interest of society that life succeeds rather than fail, and that it is acceptable to ensure that progeny has a chance of achieving this success. Ethical arguments against new eugenics include the claim that creating designer babies is not in the best interest of society as it might create a breach between genetically modified individuals and natural individuals. Additionally, some of these technologies might be economically restrictive further increasing the socio-economical gap.

Dov Fox, a law professor at the University of San Diego, argues that liberal eugenics cannot be justified on the basis of the underlying liberal theory which inspires its name. Instead he favors traditional, coersive eugenics, arguing that reprogenetic technologies like embryo selection, cellular surgery, and human genetic engineering, which aim to enhance general purpose traits in offspring, are not  practices a liberal government leaves to the discretion of parents, but practices the state makes compulsory. Fox argues that if the liberal commitment to autonomy is important enough for the state to mandate childrearing practices such as health care and basic education, that very same interest is important enough for the state to mandate safe, effective, and functionally integrated genetic practices that act on analogous all-purpose traits such as resistance to disease and general cognitive functioning. He concludes that the liberal case for compulsory eugenics is a reductio ad absurdum against liberal theory.

The United Nations International Bioethics Committee wrote that new eugenics should not be confused with the ethical problems of the 20th century eugenics movements. They have also stated the notion is nevertheless problematic as it challenges the idea of human equality and opens up new ways of discrimination and stigmatization against those who do not want or cannot afford the enhancements.

In popular culture 

 Writer and director Andrew Niccol makes direct reference to new eugenics in his movie, GattacaGattaca, via genetic discrimination between those who were altered and those who were not; with those who were not being barred from better jobs and treated differently.

See also
 Biohappiness
 Mendelian inheritance
 Online dating service: could in theory be used to share genetic information between possible partners
 Procreative beneficence

References

Further reading 

 
 
 
 
 

Applied genetics
Bioethics
 
Medical ethics
Transhumanism